Artyom Aleksandrovich Yusupov (born 29 April 1997) is a Russian football player. He plays for FC Irtysh Omsk on loan from FC Ural Yekaterinburg.

Club career
He made his debut in the Russian Premier League for FC Ural Yekaterinburg on 29 April 2017 in a game against FC Terek Grozny.

On 27 January 2021, he joined FC Volgar Astrakhan on loan until the end of the 2020–21 season. On 10 June 2021, he returned to Volgar on a new loan for the 2021–22 season.

Career statistics

References

External links
 

Tatar people of Russia
1997 births
Sportspeople from Yekaterinburg
Living people
Russian footballers
Association football midfielders
FC Ural Yekaterinburg players
FC Tyumen players
FC Zenit-2 Saint Petersburg players
FC Orenburg players
FC Volgar Astrakhan players
FC Irtysh Omsk players
Russian Premier League players
Competitors at the 2019 Summer Universiade